Kyoko Kitamura is a vocal improviser and composer residing in New York City.

Background
Kitamura is a Japanese-American musician born in New York City and raised partially in Tokyo. She studied piano at the Juilliard School of Music pre-college division but later chose to become a TV reporter with Fuji Television, a national network in Japan and was based in Paris for many years as their French news correspondent.

After quitting her job, she moved back to NYC in 1997, worked as a freelance magazine writer for a few years before getting back into music after a hiatus of close to 15 years. Unusual for a vocalist, she honed craft as a sideperson-vocalist with NYC musicians such as bassists Reggie Workman and William Parker, saxophonist Steve Coleman, cornet player Taylor Ho Bynum, among others.

Since 2010, she has been working with saxophonist and composer Anthony Braxton as one of his vocalists and as the director of communication for his organization, the Tri-Centric Foundation. Mostly recently, she appears on these Anthony Braxton albums: Trillium J, 12 Duets (DCWM) 2012, Trillium E, and his Syntactical Ghost Trance Choir live performance release (all from New Braxton House Records).

Discography
In 2018, she released her second leader album Protean Labyrinth (self-release on Bandcamp, 2018) featuring Ingrid Laubrock, Ken Filiano and Dayeon Seok. She is also the co-leader of another 2018 release Geometry of Caves (Relative Pitch Records 2018) featuring Kitamura, Joe Morris, Tomeka Reid and Taylor Ho Bynum. Discography as a sideperson includes Anthony Braxton's Trillium J (New Braxton House 2016),Trillium E (New Braxton House 2011) and 12 Duets (DCWM) 2012 (New Braxton House 2014), and Taylor Ho Bynum's Madeleine Dreams (Firehouse 12 Records 2009) among others.

Have performed and/or recorded with
Laura Andel Orchestra, Anthony Braxton, Taylor Ho Bynum, Steve Coleman, Yayoi Ikawa, Mark Lamb, Art Lande, Russ Lossing, William Parker, Jim Staley, Reggie Workman, and others.

References
Kyoko Kitamura at All About Jazz
Official website
New York Times Article on Anthony Braxton by Nate Chinen "Celebrating a Master of the Avant-Garde" Published: October 4, 2011 

American musicians of Japanese descent
American women musicians of Japanese descent
Living people
Musicians from Tokyo
Musicians from New York City
Year of birth missing (living people)
21st-century American women